Escadrille 57 of the French Air Force was founded during World War I, on 10 May 1915.

History
It was initially assigned to operate in the vicinity of Arras. It was cited in orders on 24 October 1915.

On 16 March 1916, the escadrille moved to the front lines near Verdun. It would remain there until incorporated into Groupe de Combat 11 on 1 November 1916. The escadrille served with GC 11 through war's end.

On 24 May 1917, the escadrille was again cited, for having destroyed 20 enemy aircraft and six observation balloons. This second citation entitled members of the unit to wear the fourragere of the Croix de Guerre. The arrival of SPADs late in 1917 changed the unit's name to Escadrille SPA.57.

Closely following the war's end, Escadrille SPA.57 was once again cited for its efforts. It was credited with the destruction of 65 enemy aircraft and 14 observation balloons.

Commanding officers
 Capitaine Alfred Zappelli: 10 May 1915 – 7 September 1915
 Capitaine Edouard Duseigneur: 8 September 1915 – 24 January 1917
 Lieutenant Georges Herbulot: 25 January 1917 – 13 April 1917
 Lieutenant Jean Chaput: 14 April 1917 – KIA 6 May 1917
 Lieutenant Jacques Ortoli: 7 May 1917 -

Notable personnel
 Lieutenant Jean Chaput
 Sous lieutenant Charles Nuville
 Sous lieutenant Marcel Nogues
 Lieutenant Jean Alfred Fraissinet
 Sous lieutenant Marius Hasdenteufel
 Aspirant Jean Dubois de Gennes
 Adjutant Andre Petit-Delchet

Aircraft assigned
 Nieuport: 10 May 1915
 SPAD: Late 1917

Footnotes

References
Franks, Norman; Frank W. Bailey. Over the Front: A Complete Record of the Fighter Aces and Units of the United States and French Air Services, 1914-1918 Grub Street, 1992. , .

Further reading 
 Bailey, Frank W., and Christophe Cony. French Air Service War Chronology, 1914-1918: Day-to-Day Claims and Losses by French Fighter, Bomber and Two-Seat Pilots on the Western Front. London: Grub Street, 2001.
 Davilla, James J., and Arthur M. Soltan. French Aircraft of the First World War. Stratford, CT: Flying Machines Press, 1997.
 Les escadrilles de l'aéronautique militaire française: symbolique et histoire, 1912-1920. Vincennes: Service historique de l'armée de l'air, 2004.

External links
Escadrille MS 57 - N 57 - SPA 57

1915 establishments in France
French Air and Space Force squadrons
Military units and formations established in 1915